Wahed Ahmed is a former Bangladeshi  professional footballer who played as a striker.

Career

Club
Wahed Ahmed started his professional career for Sheikh Russel KC in 2010–11.
He was the second top scorer of local player list in 2013–14 Bangladesh Football Premier League with 15 goals. In 2013 Super Cup  he scored 3 goals and became joint top scorer with Sheikh Russel KC's Jahid Hasan Ameli and Brothers Union's Jewel Rana.

After end of the season he joined Dhaka Abahani,  the rival club of his previous club.

In 2017, Wahed retired from football at the age of 26 to help run his family business.

International Goals

Olympic Team

References

Living people
1993 births
Bangladeshi footballers
Bangladesh international footballers
Mohammedan SC (Dhaka) players
Abahani Limited (Dhaka) players
Association football forwards
Footballers at the 2014 Asian Games
Asian Games competitors for Bangladesh